KLRK is a radio station (95.3 FM) licensed to Los Gatos, California, United States.

In the past, those call letters were held by:
 KRTY (FM), a radio station (91.9 FM) licensed to Great Bend, Kansas, United States, which held the call sign KLRK from 2020 to 2022
 KEKR, a radio station (1590 AM) licensed to serve Mexia, Texas, United States, which held the call sign KLRK from 2010 to 2019
 KRMX, a radio station (92.9 FM) licensed to serve Marlin, Texas, which held the call sign KLRK from 1999 to 2010